Lowell Airport can refer to:
Lowell Airport (Indiana)
Lowell Airport (Massachusetts)